Samuel Krauss (Ukk, 18 February 1866 - Cambridge, 4 June 1948) was professor at the Jewish Teachers' Seminary, Budapest, 1894–1906, and at the Jewish Theological Seminary, Vienna, 1906–1938. He moved to England as a refugee and spent his last years at Cambridge.

He was a contributor to the Jewish Encyclopedia as S. Kr.

"Professor Krauss's scholarship encompassed every area of ancient Judaism." In 1910, he became a pioneer in Talmudic archaeology with the publication of Talmudische Archäologie, which was reprinted in Hebrew in 1924. In 1998, his 1922 study of the ancient synagogue, Synagogale Altertümer, was still considered essential reading on the topic.

In 1935 he published a comprehensive and detailed study of Biblical names of ninety eight then modern nations.

Notes

External links
University of Southampton Manuscripts Collection MS 163 and bio stub
Three works of S. Krauss, and a 1936 Portrait by Lerch, Franz, 1895-1977, at cjh.org
 

1866 births
1948 deaths
Hungarian Jews
Hungarian encyclopedists
Hungarian archaeologists
Hungarian Hebraists
Jewish emigrants from Austria to the United Kingdom after the Anschluss